Meshkan Rural District may refer to:
 Meshkan Rural District (Fars Province)
 Meshkan Rural District (Razavi Khorasan Province)